Mary Ward (née King; 27 April 1827 – 31 August 1869) was an Irish naturalist, astronomer, microscopist, author, and artist. She was killed when she fell under the wheels of an experimental steam car built by her cousins. As the event occurred in 1869, she is the first person known to have been killed by a motor vehicle.

Early life
She was born Mary King in Ballylin near present-day Ferbane, County Offaly, on 27 April 1827, the youngest child of the Reverend Henry King and his wife Harriette. She and her sisters were educated at home, as were most girls at the time. However, her education was slightly different from the norm because she was of a renowned scientific family. She was interested in nature from an early age, and by the time she was three years old she was collecting insects.

Interests
Ward was a keen amateur astronomer, sharing this interest with her cousin William Parsons, 3rd Earl of Rosse. Parsons built the Leviathan of Parsonstown, a reflecting telescope with a six-foot mirror which remained the world's largest until 1917. Ward was a frequent visitor to Birr Castle, producing sketches of each stage of the process. Along with photographs made by Parson's wife Mary Rosse, Ward's sketches were used to aid in the restoration of the telescope.

Ward also drew insects, and the astronomer James South observed her doing so one day. She was using a magnifying glass to see the tiny details, and her drawing so impressed him that he immediately persuaded her father to buy her a microscope. A compound microscope made by Andrew Ross (model 112) was purchased for £48 12s 8d. This was the beginning of a lifelong passion. She began to read everything she could find about microscopy, and taught herself until she had an expert knowledge. She made her own slides from slivers of ivory, as glass was difficult to obtain, and prepared her own specimens. The physicist David Brewster asked her to make his microscope specimens, and used her drawings in many of his books and articles.

Distinctions 
Universities and most societies would not accept women, but Ward obtained information any way she could. She wrote frequently to scientists, asking them about papers they had published. During 1848, Parsons was made president of the Royal Society. Parsons, to recall, was Ward's cousin and visits to his London home meant that she met many scientists.

She was one of only three women on the mailing list for the Royal Astronomical Society (the others were Queen Victoria and Mary Somerville, a scientist for whom Somerville College at Oxford University was named).

Marriage 
On 6 December 1854, she married Henry Ward of Castle Ward, County Down, who in 1881 succeeded to the title of Viscount Bangor. They had three sons and five daughters, including Maxwell Ward, 6th Viscount Bangor. Her best-known descendants are her grandson Edward Ward, the foreign correspondent and seventh viscount, and his daughter, the Doctor Who actress Lalla Ward.

Publications
When Ward wrote her first book, Sketches with the microscope (privately printed in 1857), she apparently believed that no one would print it because of her gender or lack of academic credentials. She published 250 copies of it privately, and several hundred handbills were distributed to advertise it. The printing sold during the next few weeks, and this was enough to make a London publisher take the risk and contract for future publication. The book was reprinted eight times between 1858 and 1880 as A World of Wonders Revealed by the Microscope. A new full-colour facsimile edition at €20 was published in September 2019 by the Offaly Historical and Archaeological Society, with accompanying essays..

Her books are: A Windfall for the Microscope (1856), A World of Wonders, Revealed by the Microscope (1857), Entomology in Sport, and Entomology in Earnest (1857, with Lady Jane Mahon), Microscope Teachings (1864), Telescope Teachings (1859). She illustrated her books and articles herself, as well as many books and papers by other scientists.

Death
Ward is the first known automobile fatality. William Parsons' sons had built a steam-powered car; on 31 August 1869, she and her husband, Henry, were travelling in it with the Parsons boys (the Hons Richard Clere Parsons and the future steam turbine pioneer Charles Algernon Parsons) and their tutor, Richard Biggs. She was thrown from the car on a bend in the road at Parsonstown (present-day Birr, County Offaly). She fell under its wheels and died almost instantly. A doctor who lived near the scene arrived within moments, and found her cut, bruised, and bleeding from the ears. The fatal injury was a broken neck. It is believed that the grieving family destroyed the car after the crash.

Legacy
Ward's microscope, accessories, slides and books are on display in her husband's home, Castle Ward, County Down. William Parsons' home at Birr Castle, County Offaly, is also open to the public.

Her great-granddaughter is the English actress and author Lalla Ward.

See also

 Bridget Driscoll – (born in Ireland, 1851/1852–1896) first pedestrian death by automobile in Great Britain
 Henry H. Bliss – (1830–1899) first automobile death in the Americas

Further reading
 The Field Day Anthology of Irish Writing, Volume IV, Irish Women's Writing and Traditions, p. 653, edited by Angela Bourke et al., NYU Press, 2002. The Field Day Anthology of Irish Writing – a short biography and an overview of further work.
 A Pair of New Eyes, a play by A. L. Mentxaka, deals with the life of Mary Ward and her friendship with the pioneer photographer, designer, and architect Mary Rosse (née Field). – the play was premiered at the Sean O'Casey Theatre Dublin on 5 November 2013. A second production was staged in Smock Alley Theatre Dublin in August 2014.
 Article in August bank holiday 2019 edition of the Irish Examiner Did you know

Notes

References

External links

 Entomology in sport : and Entomology in earnest (1859)

1827 births
1869 deaths
Irish writers
Irish astronomers
Irish entomologists
Women entomologists
Irish women scientists
19th-century women scientists
Road incident deaths in the Republic of Ireland
Irish women artists
People from County Offaly
19th-century Irish scientists
19th-century astronomers
Women astronomers